Twenty Twenty Sound is the debut album by English band Dark Star, released in 1999 via Harvest Records. The tracks 'I Am The Sun' and 'Gracedealica' were released as singles.

Track listing
"96 Days"
"I Am the Sun"
"About 3am"
"Vertigo"
"Graceadelica"
"A Disaffection"
"Lies"
"What in the World's Wrong"
"The Sound of Awake"

References

1999 debut albums
Dark Star (band) albums
Albums produced by Steve Lillywhite
Harvest Records albums